Sauveur Ducazeaux (8 December 1910, Biarritz — 23 June 1987, Colmar) was a French professional road bicycle racer. He won one stage in the 1936 Tour de France. After his cycling career, he became a team captain. In 1956, he was the team captain of Roger Walkowiak, who surprisingly won the 1956 Tour de France.

Major results

1933
Paris-Chauny
1936
Tour de France:
Winner stage 15

External links 

Official Tour de France results for Sauveur Ducazeaux

1910 births
1987 deaths
Sportspeople from Biarritz
French male cyclists
French Tour de France stage winners
Cyclists from Nouvelle-Aquitaine